Chan Shing Kau (Simplified Chinese: 陳成球; Traditional Chinese: 陳成球; Pinyin: Chen Chengqiu; Born in 1952) is a Hong Kong painter specialising in ink painting.

Biography 
Chan is the Chairman of the Modern Chinese Ink Painting Association, the Vice-chairman of the Chinese Chen Clan Association of Chinese Calligraphy and Paintings, as well as the Honorary Advisor of Hong Kong Contemporary Innovative Ink Painting Association. Six exhibitions and various group exhibitions was held by Chan in Hong Kong, Taiwan, China and foreign countries. He had published five catalogues of his works. He has been rewarded several prizes of his works in different countries.

Chan was born in 1952 in Hong Kong. He was active in Hong Kong between 1975 and 1978. He was studying at The Grantham College of Education, Specializing in Fine Arts and received a Teacher Education certificate in 1975. He has also started his first exhibition namely "Hong Kong Diploma of Fine Arts Exhibition" at Hong Kong City Hall. In 1977, he studied at Hong Kong Baptist University — "the Ministry of Education Diploma" which focuses on landscape painting. Chan advanced his studies in the Department of Fine Arts in Chinese University of Hong Kong—Specialized in the Diploma of "Modern Ink" in 1978. Meanwhile, he held a Modern Ink Painting Exhibition Association at Hong Kong City Hall.

Personal views on painting associations 
Being Honorary Advisor of Hong Kong Contemporary Innovative Ink Painting Association (當代創意水墨畫會), Chan agrees that a painting association can help encouraging and forcing each member to work better. Also providing an effective platform for a group of painting enthusiasts to organize exhibitions, showing their personal experiences.

Beliefs in ink painting 
When creating ink-painted artwork, Chan aims at combining elements from western and also from Eastern due to his Western art knowledge obtained from art education and his enthusiasm towards Chinese culture. Enlightened by LIU Kuo-sung, former supervisor of the Department of Fine Arts in Chinese University of Hong Kong, he started to make changes to the dull image of traditional Chinese ink painting by adding some contemporary elements to his artwork.

Exhibitions of Chan's artworks

Solo exhibitions 
List of exhibitions Chan held solely:

Joint exhibitions 
List of exhibitions which Chan's works were displayed:
 Contemporary Ink Painting Exhibition 2010 Hong Kong home: Hong Kong Art Exhibition Square
 "Naturalistic Ink Fun" (墨趣天然) Liu Kuo-sung contemporary water 2014: Hong Kong-day Fun International Art
 Hong Kong's new look modern ink Exhibition 1990: Taiwan Taichung Capital Center for the Arts
 Painting Exhibition (Tokyo, Japan)
 2014 - Exhibition of Hong Kong Art Field: 65th Anniversary of Chinese National Day

Awards 
In Chan's career he has been awarded several times. Awards he obtained are listed below:

Significant artworks 
List of well-known artworks that Chan did:

References

External links
Official Page at CIIPAHK

1952 births
Living people
Hong Kong painters
Contemporary painters